Jose Rogério de Melo (born 3 October 1974), commonly known as Rogério is a retired Brazilian football midfielder. During his career, Rogério played for Vitória, Boavista, Sport Club Recife, Estrela da Amadora, Campinense and Rapid București.

External links

1974 births
Living people
Footballers from São Paulo
Brazilian footballers
Association football forwards
Esporte Clube Vitória players
Primeira Liga players
Boavista F.C. players
Campeonato Brasileiro Série A players
Sport Club do Recife players
Vitória F.C. players
Campinense Clube players
Liga Portugal 2 players
C.F. Estrela da Amadora players
Austrian Football Bundesliga players
SK Rapid Wien players
Campeonato Brasileiro Série C players
Brazilian expatriate footballers
Expatriate footballers in Portugal
Brazilian expatriate sportspeople in Portugal
Expatriate footballers in Austria
Brazilian expatriate sportspeople in Austria